Abbey Road is the principal north to south arterial road through Barrow-in-Furness, Cumbria, England.

Background
Abbey Road's name derives from Furness Abbey, a former Cistercian monastery along the route of the road.

Abbey Road predates Barrow itself although it was substantially upgraded to its current appearance during the mid-19th century, when the town was undergoing dramatic growth. The  of Abbey Road that runs through Barrow is a tree-lined boulevard with multiple lanes, while the northern section of the road beyond Mill Brow is single lane, winding and more rural in nature. Sites along Abbey Road include Dalton town centre, Furness General Hospital, Barrow Park, Barrow-in-Furness railway station, Barrow town centre and several of Barrow's retail parks.

Until 1932, the Barrow-in-Furness Tramways Company operated a tram line along Abbey Road from Ramsden Square to the current location of Furness General Hospital.

Junctions and intersections

Significant intersections on the system include (from north to south): 
 Market Street
 Long Lane
 Park Road
 Dalton Lane
 Rating Lane
 Hawcoat Lane/Hollow Lane
 Cheltenham Street/Park Drive
 Holker Street/Rawlinson Street
 Hartington Street/Dalton Road
 Duke Street at Ramsden Square
 Hindpool Road

Listed buildings

The southern stretch of Abbey Road from Rawlinson Street to Hindpool Road lies entirely within the Central Barrow Conservation Area, the list below includes every listed building located on Abbey Road.

 298 Abbey Road (Grade II)
 Abbey House Hotel (Grade II*)
 Abbey Road Conservatives Club (Grade II)
 Abbotswood Lodge (Grade II)
 Barrow Main Public Library (Grade II)
 Central Fire Station (Grade II)
 Cooke's Building (Grade II)
 Custom House (Grade II)
 Duke of Edinburgh Hotel (Grade II)
 John Whinnerah Institute (Grade II)
 Mill Brow Lodge (Grade II)
 Nan Tait Centre (Grade II)
 National Westminster Bank (Grade II)
 Oxford Chambers (Grade II)
 Ramsden Hall (Grade II)
 Statue of Sir James Ramsden (Grade II)
 St. Mary's Church (Grade II*)
 White Horse Public House (Grade II)
 Working Men's Club and Institute (Grade II)

References

Streets in Barrow-in-Furness